The Ecuadorian ambassador next the European Commission is the official representative of the Government in Quito to the European Commission. He is concurrently accredited to  the government of  Bélgium, the government in the Hague Netherlands, in Paris and the UNESCO.

List of representatives

References 

 
European Commission
Ecuador